Crawinkel is a village and a former municipality in the district of Gotha, Thuringia, Germany. Since 1 January 2019, it is part of the town Ohrdruf. Crawinkel was first mentioned in 1088.

After the Armistice with France in 1940, during World War II, German forces took numerous memorials from the forest of Compiègne, where the Armistice with Germany that ended World War I was also signed, as prizes to Crawinkel. These included the actual railway carriage where both armistices were concluded. In 1945, the car was dynamited and its pieces buried. Since the German reunification in 1989, numerous artifacts have been recovered and returned to France.

References 

Gotha (district)
Saxe-Coburg and Gotha
Former municipalities in Thuringia